Eviphididae is a family of mites in the order Mesostigmata.

Species

Alliphis Halbert, 1923
 Alliphis ankavani Arutunian, 1992      
 Alliphis bakeri Arutunian, 1992      
 Alliphis brevisternalis Ma-Liming & Wang-Shenron, 1998      
 Alliphis hirschmanni Arutunian, 1991      
 Alliphis huangzhongensis Li, 2001      
 Alliphis kargi Arutunian, 1991      
 Alliphis longicornis Gu & Liu, 1996      
 Alliphis longirivulus Gu & Liu, 1996      
 Alliphis magnus Gu & Fan, 1997      
 Alliphis necrophilus Christie, 1983      
 Alliphis phoreticus Masan, 1994      
 Alliphis pratensis (Karg, 1965)      
 Alliphis rosickyi Samsinak & Daniel, 1978      
 Alliphis rotundianalis Masan, 1994      
 Alliphis serrochaetae Ramaraju & Mohanasundaram, 1996      
 Alliphis siculus (Oudemans, 1905)      
 Alliphis sinicus Gu & Bai, in Gu, Bai & Huang Gu 1989      
 Alliphis stenosternus Gu & Liu, 1996      
 Alliphis trichiensis Ramaraju & Mohanasundaram, 1996      
 Alliphis yinchuanensis Gu & Bai, 1997      
 Alliphis yuxiensis Gu & Fan, 1997     
Copriphis Berlese, 1910
 Copriphis crinitus (Berlese, 1882) 
 Copriphis cultratellus   
 Copriphis falcinellus (R. Canestrini & G. Canestrini, 1882)      
 Copriphis pterophilus (Berlese, 1882)      
Crassicheles Karg, 1963
 Crassicheles concentricus (Oudemans, 1904)  
Cryptoseius Makarova, 1998
 Cryptoseius petrovae Makarova, 1998      
Evimirus Karg, 1963
 Evimirus leptogenitalis Karg, 1979      
 Evimirus pentagonius Karg, 1996      
 Evimirus pulcherpori Karg, 1989      
 Evimirus uropodinus (Berlese, 1903)      
Eviphis Berlese, 1903
 Eviphis acutus Tao & Gu, 1996      
 Eviphis barunensis Samsinak & Daniel, 1978  
 Eviphis chanti Arutunian, 1992      
 Eviphis cryptognathus Gu & Bai, 1990      
 Eviphis cultratellus (Berlese, 1910)      
 Eviphis dalianensis Sun, Yin & Zhang, 1992      
 Eviphis emeiensis Zhou, Wang & Ji, 1990      
 Eviphis himalayaensis Ma & Piao, 1981      
 Eviphis hirtellus (Berlese, 1892)      
 Eviphis huainanensis Wen, 1965      
 Eviphis nanchongensis Zhou, Chen & Wei, 1990      
 Eviphis oeconomus Yang & Gu, 1991      
 Eviphis ostrinus (C.L. Koch, 1835)      
 Eviphis parindicus Bhattacharyya, 1993      
 Eviphis pyrobolus (C.L.Koch, 1839)      
 Eviphis qinghaiensis Chen & Li, 1998      
 Eviphis ramosae Ramaraju & Mohanasundaram, 1996      
 Eviphis ruoergaiensis Zhou, Chen & Wei, 1990      
 Eviphis shaanxiensis Gu & Huang, in Gu, Bai & Huang 1989      
 Eviphis sikkimensis Bhattacharyya, 1993      
 Eviphis spatulaesetae Ramaraju & Mohanasundaram, 1996      
 Eviphis tongdensis Li, Yang & Wang, 2000      
 Eviphis tsherepanovi Davydova, 1979      
 Eviphis wanglangensis Zhou, Chen & Wei, 1990      
 Eviphis zolotarenkoi Davydova, 1979      
Pelethiphis Berlese, 1911
 Pelethiphis balachovi Arutunian, 1992      
 Pelethiphis insignis Berlese, 1911      
 Pelethiphis opacus Koyumdjieva, 1981      
Rafaphis Skorupski & Blaszak, 1997
 Rafaphis microsternalis Skorupski & Blaszak, 1997      
Scamaphis Karg, 1976
 Scamaphis equestris (Berlese, 1911)      
 Scamaphis exanimis Karg, 1976      
 Scamaphis guyimingi Ma-Liming, 1997      
Scarabacariphis P. Masan, 1994
 Scarabacariphis grandisternalis P. Masan, 1994      
Scarabaspis Womersley, 1956
 Scarabaspis altaicus Skljar, in Sklyar 1999      
 Scarabaspis aspera Womersley, 1956      
 Scarabaspis concavus Gu & Fan, 1997      
 Scarabaspis goulouensis Liu, Cu & Ma, 1992      
 Scarabaspis inexpectatus (Oudemans, 1903)      
Thinoseius Halbert, 1920
 Thinoseius berlesei Halbert, 1920      
 Thinoseius occidentalipacificus Klimov, 1998      
 Thinoseius orchestoideae (Hall, 1912)      
 Thinoseuis ramsayi Evans, 1969      
 Thinoseius sawadai Takaku, 2000      
 Thinoseius setifer Takaku, 2000

Hosts
The Thinoseius genera is known to parasitize the specific species of insects, C. frigida and their overarching genera Coelopa. There is still research being done on the parasitic behavior demonstrated from other genera of the Eviphididae.

References

Mesostigmata
Acari families